is a railway station on the Toyama Chihō Railway Main Line in the city of Kurobe, Toyama, Japan, operated by the private railway operator Toyama Chihō Railway.

Lines

Station layout 
The station has two ground-level opposed island platforms with one ground-level island platform sandwiched in-between. The platforms are reached by crossing the first track by a level crossing and walking up the stairs. The side platform furthest from the station building is not in service. The station is staffed. There is a depot with two tracks at the opposite side of the station building. To the east from the station building, there is a dead-end track.

History
It was renamed  in June 1951, and renamed Dentetsu-Kurobe Station on 1 April 1989.

Adjacent stations

Passenger statistics
In fiscal 2015, the station was used by 748 passengers daily.

Surrounding area 
Kurobe City Hall
Kurobe Post Office

See also
 List of railway stations in Japan

References

External links

 

Railway stations in Toyama Prefecture
Railway stations in Japan opened in 1922
Stations of Toyama Chihō Railway
Kurobe, Toyama